Fred C. Brannon (April 26, 1901 – April 6, 1953) was an American film director of the 1940s and 1950s.

He directed over 40 films between 1945 and his death.

His first film The Purple Monster Strikes in 1945 was co-directed with Spencer Gordon Bennet.

Filmography
1945: The Purple Monster Strikes
1946: The Phantom Rider (as Fred Brannon)
1946: King of the Forest Rangers (as Fred Bannon)
1946: Daughter of Don Q
1946: The Crimson Ghost
1947: Son of Zorro
1947: Jesse James Rides Again
1947: The Black Widow
1948: G-Men Never Forget
1948: Dangers of the Canadian Mounted (as Fred Bannon)
1948: Adventures of Frank and Jesse James (as Fred Brannon)
1949: Federal Agents vs. Underworld, Inc.
1949: Ghost of Zorro
1949: Frontier Investigator
1949: King of the Rocket Men
1949: Bandit King of Texas
1949: The James Brothers of Missouri
1949: Radar Patrol vs. Spy King
1950: Gunmen of Abilene
1950: Code of the Silver Sage
1950: Salt Lake Raiders
1950: The Invisible Monster
1950: Desperadoes of the West
1950: Vigilante Hideout
1950: Rustlers on Horseback
1950: Flying Disc Man from Mars
1951: Arizona Manhunt
1951: Lost Planet Airmen
1951: Government Agents vs Phantom Legion
1951: Don Daredevil Rides Again
1951: Night Riders of Montana
1951: Rough Riders of Durango
1952: Radar Men from the Moon
1952: Captive of Billy the Kid
1952: Wild Horse Ambush
1952: Zombies of the Stratosphere
1953: Jungle Drums of Africa
1955: Commando Cody: Sky Marshal of the Universe
1958: Missile Monsters
1958: Satan's Satellites
1959: Ghost of Zorro
1964: Cyclotrode 'X'
1965: R.C.M.P. and the Treasure of Genghis Khan (as Fred Brannon)
1966: D-Day on Mars

External links 
 

American film directors
Film serial crew
1901 births
1953 deaths